Shipbuilding Industry Corporation (SBIC) is a state-owned shipbuilding holding group in Vietnam, which offers a wide variety of new building choice from merchant vessel to platform supply vessel to other custom made-to-order ships. It was established based on restructured Vietnam Shipbuilding Industry Group.

History

Shipbuilding Industry Corporation's predecessor Vietnam Shipbuilding Industry Group (Vinashin) is a state-owned shipbuilding firm in Vietnam. It was one of Vietnam's leading industrial concerns, and entered into a partnership with Damen, Kongsberg, and Hyundai. Vinashin was heavily indebted, and executives have been arrested for mismanagement, but it has been claimed that further restructuring would allow debts to be repaid within a year. Vinashin folded under a debt burden of $4.5 billion in 2010; as of March 2011, it was being restructured.

Ports
Vinashin operated several ports and shipyards around Vietnam.

In August 2010, Damen Vinashin began construction on a new shipyard on a  site in Haiphong

Ships built
Vinashin constructed both merchant ships and military ships. A number of ships in the Vietnam People's Navy were built by Vinashin.

Merchant ship construction included dry cargo, tankers, lash carriers, and passenger vessels.

Vinashin was the largest shipbuilder in Vietnam, accounting for approximately 80% of shipbuilding capacity.

References

External links
 

Manufacturing companies based in Hanoi
Defence companies of Vietnam
Shipbuilding companies of Vietnam
Government-owned companies of Vietnam
Manufacturing companies established in 2013
Transport in Vietnam
Vietnamese companies established in 2013